Ze'ev Schiff (‎; 1 July 1932 - 19 June 2007) was an Israeli journalist and military correspondent for Haaretz.

Schiff moved to Mandatory Palestine with his family in 1935. He studied Middle Eastern affairs and military history at Tel Aviv University.

Schiff wrote numerous books, including Israel's Lebanon War and Intifada, both with Ehud Ya'ari, and A History of the Israeli Army: 1874 to the Present. He also served as a military correspondent in Vietnam, the Soviet Union, Cyprus and Ethiopia.  Schiff won several prizes, including the Sokolov Journalism Prize, the Amos Lev Prize, and the Sarah Reichenstein Prize.

He joined the Haaretz staff in 1955 and became senior associate of the Carnegie Endowment for International Peace in 1984. He was the chairman of the Military Writers Association, a fellow at the Washington Institute for Near East Policy and an Isaac and Mildred Brochstein Fellow in Peace and Security at the James A. Baker III Institute for Public Policy at Rice University.

Schiff died in 2007 in Tel Aviv.

Published works
 Wings over Suez (the Israeli Air Force during the War of Attrition), 1970.
 
 War of Deception (1982 Lebanon War), 1984.
  (First Intifada)

References

External links
  from 
 
 
 

Israeli journalists
1932 births
2007 deaths
Haaretz people
People from Lille
Israeli people of French-Jewish descent
French emigrants to Israel
Israeli non-fiction writers
Rice University fellows
Burials at Kiryat Shaul Cemetery